Weeley Heath is a hamlet on the B1441 road and the B1414 road, in the Tendring district, in the English county of Essex. Nearby settlements include the villages of Weeley and Little Clacton. In 2018 it had an estimated population of 719.

Amenities 
Weeley Heath has a fire station and a place of worship.

Other features 
There is also Weeleyhall Wood Nature Reserve in the village.

References 

Hamlets in Essex
Tendring